It Doesn't Hurt Me (Russian: Мне не больно: Mne ne bolno) is a 2006 Russian film directed by Aleksey Balabanov. The film was released on June 15, 2006 in Russia and stars Renata Litvinova, Aleksandr Yatsenko, and Dmitriy Dyuzhev as three young adults living in St.Petersburg.

Synopsis
Tata (Renata Litvinova) is a vivacious young woman whose health is deteriorating due to leukemia. When she meets Misha (Aleksandr Yatsenko) and Oleg (Dmitriy Dyuzhev), the three hit it off well and Tata begins to date Misha. The problem is that she keeps her diagnosis from Misha, which complicates the relationship.

Cast
Renata Litvinova as Tata
Aleksandr Yatsenko as Misha
Dmitriy Dyuzhev as Oleg
Nikita Mikhalkov as Sergei Sergeyevich
Inga Strelkova-Oboldina as Alya (as Inga Oboldina-Strelkova)
Valentin Kuznetsov as Vasya
Sergey Makovetskiy as Doctor
Mark Rudinstein as Zilberman
Marina Solopchenko as Zilberman's wife
Mariya Nikiforova as Doctor's wife
Ilya Mozgovoy as Security guard Sasha
Sami Hurskulahti as Otto
Veronika Dmitriyeva as Girl in train
Dariya Utkina as Tanya (as Dasha Utkina)
Marina Shpakovskaya as Prostitute

Reception
Time Out Russia gave the movie a positive review and called it a "strong melodrama". Seans, a Saint Petersburg-published magazine specializing on cinema published a number of short review of the most influential authors. The reviews were generally positive, and, in particular, they emphasized a good performance of Litvinova.

Awards
Best Actress at the MTV Movie Awards, Russia (2007, nominated - Renata Litvinova)
Best Actor at the Sochi Open Russian Film Festival (2006, won - Aleksandr Yatsenko)
Best Actress at the Sochi Open Russian Film Festival (2006, won - Renata Litvinova)
Grand Prize at the Sochi Open Russian Film Festival (2006, nominated)
Best film, Golden Eagle Award (2006, nominated)

Further reading
Florian Weinhold (2013), Path of Blood: The Post-Soviet Gangster, His Mistress and Their Others in Aleksei Balabanov's Genre Films, Reaverlands Books: North Charleston, SC: pp. 139-163.

References

External links
 
 

Films directed by Aleksei Balabanov
Russian romantic drama films
2006 romantic drama films
2006 films
Films shot in Saint Petersburg
Films set in Saint Petersburg